Karlo Umek (8 February 1917 – 25 September 2010) was a Slovenian Olympic shooter who represented Yugoslavia at the 1960 Summer Olympics in Rome, competing in the Men's Free Pistol, 50 metres event, where he placed 22nd. He was born in Bojsno. At the time of his death, he was the oldest living Slovenian Olympic athlete.

References

1917 births
2010 deaths
Yugoslav male sport shooters
Slovenian male sport shooters
Shooters at the 1960 Summer Olympics
Olympic shooters of Yugoslavia
People from the Municipality of Brežice